Widom scaling (after Benjamin Widom) is a hypothesis in statistical mechanics regarding the free energy of a magnetic system near its critical point which leads to the critical exponents becoming no longer independent so that they can be parameterized in terms of two values. The hypothesis can be seen to arise as a natural consequence of the block-spin renormalization procedure, when the block size is chosen to be of the same size as the correlation length.

Widom scaling is an example of universality.

Definitions 

, for 
, for 

where

 measures the temperature relative to the critical point.

Near the critical point, Widom's scaling relation reads

.

where  has an expansion
,
with 
being Wegner's exponent governing the approach to scaling.

Derivation 

The scaling hypothesis is that near the critical point, the free energy , in  dimensions, can be written as the sum of a slowly varying regular part  and a singular part , with the singular part being a scaling function, i.e., a homogeneous function, so that

Then taking the partial derivative with respect to  H and the form of M(t,H) gives

 for 

Comparing this with the definition of  yields its value,

Similarly, putting  and  into the scaling relation for M yields

Hence

Applying the expression for the isothermal susceptibility  in terms of M to the scaling relation yields

Similarly for the expression for specific heat  in terms of M to the scaling relation yields

As a consequence of Widom scaling, not all critical exponents are independent but they can be parameterized by two numbers  with the relations expressed as

The relations are experimentally well verified for magnetic systems and fluids.

References
H. E. Stanley, Introduction to Phase Transitions and Critical Phenomena
H. Kleinert and V. Schulte-Frohlinde, Critical Properties of φ4-Theories, World Scientific (Singapore, 2001);  Paperback  (also available online)

Critical phenomena
Statistical mechanics